Chen Yejie (born 6 April 2001) is a Chinese swimmer. She competed in the women's 1500 metre freestyle event at the 2017 World Aquatics Championships held in Budapest, Hungary.

References

External links
 

2001 births
Living people
Place of birth missing (living people)
Chinese female freestyle swimmers